John Folan DCM, born in Cashel, County Galway, (DOB 1895 – ) was an Irish recipient of the DCM, the Distinguished Conduct Medal, the second highest for gallantry in the face of the enemy that can be awarded to British and Commonwealth forces.

He also won the Order of the Karađorđe's Star for service on the Macedonian Front in 1917.

Details
He was a private in the 3rd Battalion, Connaught Rangers, British Army during World War I when the following deed took place for which he was awarded the DCM.

"For conspicuous gallantry when in command of a trench. Although wounded, he held on to his position after part of the line had been rushed."

The Connacht Tribune in June, 1915 reported

Reward for Gallantry. It has caused much satisfaction in Cashel (Connemara), to learn that Private John Folan of the Connacht Rangers, has been awarded the Distinguished Conduct Medal in Mesopotamia. Though seriously wounded, and after his officer has been shot, he rallied his company, and held a line of trenches against the Turks. He is a son of the late Thomas Folan, pilot, Canower, County Galway.

Distinguished Conduct Medal
The following announcement appeared in June 1916 and since there was usually a gap of about 3 months before a specific event and the announcement of an award it would normally relate to something occurring in early 1916.

LONDON GAZETTE 13 JUNE 1916 DCM ANNOUNCEMENT 
'His Majesty the KING has been graciously pleased, on the occasion of His Majesty's Birthday, to approve of the undermentioned rewards for distinguished services in connection with Military Operations with the British Forces in Salonika:—

AWARDED THE DISTINGUISHED CONDUCT MEDAL.
3/5582 Pte. J. Folan, 3rd Bn, Conn. Rang.

SUPPLEMENT TO THE LONDON GAZETTE, 13 JULY 1916
‘With reference to the dispatch published in June 1916, the following are mentioned for distinguished and gallant services rendered during the period of Sir Charles Munro’s command of the Mediterramean Expeditionary Force*.'
3/5582 Pte. J. Folan, 3rd Bn, Conn. Rang.

See also
 Ó Cualáin

References
 The London Gazette, 3 June 1916
 The London Gazette, 21 June 1916
 The London Gazette, 13 July 1916
 The London Gazette, 21 April 1917
 Irish National Archives – 1901 Census

1895 births
British Army personnel of World War I
Recipients of the Distinguished Conduct Medal
People from County Galway
Irish people of World War I
Year of death missing